The United Democratic Forces (ОДС/ODS) were a center-right electoral alliance in Bulgaria, led by the Union of Democratic Forces.

Members of the coalition

1997 
Union of Democratic Forces (Sayuz na Demokratichnite Sili)
Bulgarian Agrarian People's Union (Bulgarski Zemedelski Naroden Sayuz)
Democratic Party (Demokraticheska Partiya)
Bulgarian Social Democratic Party (Bulgarska Socialdemokraticheska Partiya)
Radical Democratic Party (Radikaldemokraticheska Partiya)

2001 
Union of Democratic Forces (Sayuz na Demokratichnite Sili)
Bulgarian Agrarian People's Union - People's Union (Bulgarski Zemedelski Naroden Sayuz - Naroden Sayuz)
Democratic Party (Demokraticheska Partiya)
Bulgarian Social Democratic Party (Bulgarska Socialdemokraticheska Partiya)
National Movement for Rights and Freedoms (Natsionalno Dvizhenie za Prava i Svobodi)
Radical Democratic Party (Radikaldemokraticheska Partiya)
Union of Free Democrats (Sajuz na Svobodnite Demokrati)

2005 
Union of Democratic Forces (Sayuz na Demokratichnite Sili)
Democratic Party (Demokraticheska Partiya)
Bulgarian Agrarian People's Union (Bulgarski Zemedelski Naroden Sayuz)
George's Day Movement (Dvizhenie Gergiovden)
National Association - Bulgarian Agrarian People's Union (Natsionalno Sdruzhenie - Bulgarski Zemedelski Naroden Sayuz)
Movement for an Equal Public Model (Dvizhenie za Ravnopraven Model)
Radical Democratic Party (Radikaldemokraticheska Partiya)

Elections results
 In the 1997 Bulgarian parliamentary election the Coalition won 49,2% of the popular vote and 139 out of 240 seats.
 In the 2001 Bulgarian parliamentary election, the coalition won  18.2% of the popular vote and 51 out of 240 seats.
 In the 2005 Bulgarian parliamentary election, the coalition won 7,7% of the popular vote and 20 of 240 seats

References

Defunct political party alliances in Bulgaria
Political parties with year of establishment missing
Political parties with year of disestablishment missing